IdontWantDowry.com is India's first matrimonial website for dowry-free marriages. The website was launched on April 2, 2006 by Nalini Chidambaram, a senior high court advocate in Chennai. Despite being outlawed in 1961, the dowry system has continued to survive in some social castes. IDontWantDowry.com attempts to create a meeting place for brides and grooms who want to marry without a dowry. As of 2017, IdontWantDowry.com has more than 5,500 members and 29 couples have married through the website.

IdontWantDowry.com conducts "Matrimonial Meets" known as "Swyamavaraams". This is a place where brides and grooms can meet in person to choose their life partner.

In addition, IdontWantDowry.com has launched a job portal, which is an online platform that provides employment opportunities for the disabled.

References

External links
 Official website
 In.reuters.com

Internet properties established in 2006
Indian matrimonial websites
Online dating services of India